The Glamour Awards is an annual set of awards hosted by Glamour magazine. Woman of the Year awards honour "extraordinary and inspirational" women from a variety of fields, including entertainment, business, sports, music, science, medicine, education and politics. There is also an award handed out each year called the Man of the Year for men.

Winners

1999
Woman of the Year – Jennifer Lopez

2000s

2001
 Woman of the Year 
 Salma Hayek
 Susan Stroman
Moira Smith

2002
 Oral Lee Brown

2003

2004

2005

2006

2007

2008

2009

2010s

2010

2011

2012

2013

2014

2015 
25th Anniversary.

2017
References:

2018
References:

2019
 Greta Thunberg

Criticism
After Glamour announced that it would be giving an award to Caitlyn Jenner in November 2015, the husband of New York police officer Moira Smith returned the "Woman of the Year" award that Glamour had awarded her, with an open letter to Cyndi Lieve, the magazine's editor-in-chief.

See also

 List of awards honoring women
Glamour

External links
 Official website (US)
 Official website (UK)

References

British awards
American music awards
American film awards
Awards honoring women
2003 establishments in the United Kingdom
Awards established in 2003
Annual events in the United Kingdom